The 1976 New York City Marathon was the 7th edition of the New York City Marathon and took place in New York City on .

After running in this race, Catalan chemist Ramón Oliu was inspired to organize the first marathon in Catalonia, in Palafrugell in 1978.  This race was also the first popular marathon in Spain, and eventually became the Barcelona Marathon.

Results

Men

Women

References

External links

New York City Marathon, 1976
Marathon
New York City Marathon
New York City